Dusty Ermine is a 1936 British crime film directed by Bernard Vorhaus and starring Anthony Bushell, Jane Baxter and Ronald Squire. In the United States it was released under the alternative title Hideout in the Alps. It was based on the play of the same title by Neil Grant.

Plot
After being released from prison Jim Kent, a leading forger, is approached by an international counterfeiting organisation. He rejects their offer of employment as he intends to go straight, but when he discovers that his nephew is now working for the outfit he travels to Switzerland to try to help him out. An ambitious young detective from Scotland Yard is also on the trail of the forgery ring, and mistakenly comes to the conclusion that Jim Kent is still working as a master counterfeiter.

Cast
 Anthony Bushell as Detective Inspector Forsythe 
 Jane Baxter as Linda Kent 
 Ronald Squire as Jim Kent 
 Arthur Macrae as Gilbert Kent 
 Margaret Rutherford as Evelyn Summers
 Austin Trevor as Swiss Hotelier-Gang Leader 
 Davina Craig as Goldie, the maid 
 Athole Stewart as Mr. Kent 
 Katie Johnson as Emily Kent 
 Felix Aylmer as Police Commissioner 
 Hal Gordon as Detective Sergeant Helmsley 
 George Merritt as Police constable 
 Wally Patch as Thug

Production
The film was produced by Julius Hagen, the owner of a film production company based around Twickenham Studios. The film was shot at one of his other studios, J.H. Studios at Elstree, and also included extensive location filming in the Alps. It was directed by Vorhaus who had worked on earlier films for the company. Vorhaus was so impressed by the performance of Margaret Rutherford in a theatre production he saw her in, that he insisted on casting her in the film. He added a new comic relief role to the original play especially for her. The film's art direction was by Andrew Mazzei.

Hagen had an ambitious programme of films for 1936, but his failure to secure effective distribution led to financial problems and the collapse of his company the following year during the Slump of 1937. Vorhaus directed one further British film, Cotton Queen, before returning to America.

In the forgers' lair the printing presses shown are all made by the Adana company of Twickenham and completely unsuitable for the production of currency notes. Adana was based in Twickenham and the film was released through Twickenham Film Distributors, so there would appear to be a local link.

References

Bibliography
 Low, Rachael. History of the British Film: Filmmaking in 1930s Britain. George Allen & Unwin, 1985 
 Richards, Jeffrey (ed.). The Unknown Thirties: An Alternative History of the British Cinema, 1929-1939. I.B. Tauris & Co, 2000.

External links

1936 films
British crime films
1936 crime films
Films directed by Bernard Vorhaus
British films based on plays
Films set in London
Films set in England
Films set in France
Films set in Switzerland
Films set in the Alps
Skiing films
Films shot at Station Road Studios, Elstree
British black-and-white films
1930s English-language films
1930s British films